Merrillsville Cure Cottage, also known as Merrillsville Town Hall, is a historic cure cottage located at Merrillsville in the town of Franklin, Franklin County, New York.  It was built about 1900 as part of a tuberculosis curing facility that also included a main lodge and numerous tent platform.  It was moved to its present site in 1920.  It is a small, rectangular one story frame building, sheathed in dark brown cedar shingles. It is topped by a gable roof with exposed wooden rafters. It features a full-width, glass-enclosed cure porch.

It was listed on the National Register of Historic Places in 1995.

References

Houses on the National Register of Historic Places in New York (state)
Houses completed in 1900
Houses in Franklin County, New York
National Register of Historic Places in Franklin County, New York